Nelson Kawulukusi Sewankambo, MBChB, MMed, MSc, FRCP, LLD (Hon), sometimes spelled as Nelson Ssewankambo, is a Ugandan physician, academician, medical researcher, and medical administrator. He is a professor of medicine and former principal of the Makerere University College of Health Sciences, a semi-autonomous constituent college of Makerere University.

Background
He was born at Mulago Hospital, in Kampala, Uganda's capital city, in 1952.

Education
Sewankambo was educated at Namilyango College, an all-boys residential middle and high school (grades: eight to thirteen) located in Mukono District, from 1965 until 1970. In 1971, he entered the Makerere University School of Medicine, where he obtained the degree of Bachelor of Medicine and Bachelor of Surgery, graduating in 1976. He went on to obtain the Master of Medicine degree, specializing in Internal Medicine, also from Makerere in the early 1980s. He later obtained a Master of Science degree in Clinical Epidemiology, from McMaster University in Hamilton, Ontario, Canada. He is a Fellow of the Royal College of Physicians. He was later awarded an honorary degree of Doctor of Laws by McMaster University.

Work experience
In the early 1980s, Sewankambo was one of the earliest physicians in Uganda to recognize the new disease that caused patients to lose weight and "slim" down to abnormal cachectic sizes. The new disease, at first called Slim Disease, became known as HIV/AIDS. He has been at the forefront of research about the disease, specializing in HIV clinical drug trials. He has extensively published the finding of his research in medical journals and other peer publications. In the late 1990s, he was appointed Dean of Makerere University School of Medicine. He served in that position until 2007 when he was promoted to the position of Principal, Makerere University College of Health Sciences, a position he still occupies. He has been engaged in a number of international boards, one of them is the Board of the Norwegian Global Health and Vaccination Research for 2011 to 2014.

Other considerations
Sewankambo is a Fellow of the Uganda National Academy of Sciences.

See also
 Makerere University School of Medicine
 Uganda AIDS Commission
 David Serwadda

References

External links
 Board Members of The Network of African Science Academies (NASAC) 2013 to 2016

Living people
1952 births
Ganda people
Makerere University alumni
McMaster University alumni
Ugandan epidemiologists
People from Wakiso District
Ugandan Roman Catholics
People from Central Region, Uganda
People educated at Namilyango College
HIV/AIDS researchers
Fellows of the Royal College of Physicians
Fellows of Uganda National Academy of Sciences
20th-century Ugandan physicians
21st-century Ugandan physicians
Members of the National Academy of Medicine
Fellows of the African Academy of Sciences